Complex commonly refers to:

 Complexity, the behaviour of a system whose components interact in multiple ways so possible interactions are difficult to describe
 Complex system, a system composed of many components which may interact with each other
 Complex (psychology), a core pattern of emotions etc. in the personal unconscious organized around a common theme such as power or status

Complex may also refer to:

Arts, entertainment and media
 Complex (English band), formed in 1968, and their 1971 album Complex
 Complex (band), a Japanese rock band
 Complex (album), by Montaigne, 2019, and its title track
 Complex (EP), by Rifle Sport, 1985
 "Complex" (song), by Gary Numan, 1979
 "Complex", a song by Katie Gregson-MacLeod, 2022
 Complex Networks, publisher of the now-only-online magazine Complex

Biology
 Protein–ligand complex, a complex of a protein bound with a ligand
 Exosome complex, a multi-protein intracellular complex 
 Protein complex, a group of two or more associated polypeptide chains
 Species complex, a cluster of very similar species difficult to delimit
 Pre-Bötzinger complex, a cluster of interneurons in the ventral respiratory group of the medulla of the brainstem

Chemistry
 Coordination complex, a central atom or ion and a surrounding array of bound molecules or ions
 Chelate complex, a coordination complex with more than one bond

Mathematics
 Complex number, an extension of real numbers obtained by adjoining imaginary numbers
 Complex polytope, a generalization of a polytope in a complex Hilbert space
 Complex analysis, the study of functions of complex numbers
 Complex, an element of a field of sets
 Chain complex, an algebraic structure
 Simplicial complex, a kind of topological space 
 CW complex, a kind of topological space
 Line complex, a 3-dimensional family of lines in space

Geology
 Complex (geology), a unit of rocks composed of rocks of two or three types
 Complex crater, a type of large impact crater morphology
 Volcanic complex, a group of volcanoes
 Complex volcano, a volcano of mixed form
 Accretionary complex, a fossil accretionary wedge

Other uses 
 Building complex, a group of inter-related buildings
 Housing complex, specifically residential
 UCL Centre for Mathematics and Physics in the Life Sciences and Experimental Biology (CoMPLEX), part of UCL Faculty of Mathematical and Physical Sciences, London, UK

See also

 Complexity (disambiguation)
 Complexity theory (disambiguation)
 Military–industrial complex